Bockhampton is the name of several settlements in England:

Bockhampton, Berkshire, an area of Lambourn
Higher Bockhampton, a hamlet east of Dorchester, Dorset, birthplace of Thomas Hardy, and site of Thomas Hardy's Cottage
Lower Bockhampton, a hamlet east of Dorchester, Dorset
Middle Bockhampton, a hamlet north of Christchurch, Dorset; see List of United Kingdom locations: Mid-Mig
North Bockhampton, a hamlet north of Christchurch, Dorset; see List of United Kingdom locations: Ni-North G
South Bockhampton, a hamlet north of Christchurch, Dorset; see List of United Kingdom locations: South

See also
Brockhampton (disambiguation)